Ángel Peña [PAY-nyah] (born February 16, 1975), is a former catcher in Major League Baseball.

Career
Signed by the Los Angeles Dodgers as an amateur free agent in 1992, Peña made his major league debut with the Dodgers on September 8, 1998, and appeared in his final game on June 1, 2001.
 
At one point in his career, Peña was heralded as the catcher of the future for the Dodgers.  He initially was to take the spot of the traded Mike Piazza. However, poor conditioning and the emergence of future All-Star Paul Lo Duca spelled the end of Peña's days as a Dodger, and subsequently as a major league catcher.  Pena was released by the Dodgers on October 15, 2001. He briefly played in the San Francisco Giants minor league system and in independent baseball leagues after that but is now out of baseball.

External links

1975 births
Albuquerque Dukes players
Camden Riversharks players
Dominican Republic expatriate baseball players in Mexico
Dominican Republic expatriate baseball players in South Korea
Dominican Republic expatriate baseball players in the United States
Fresno Grizzlies players
Great Falls Dodgers players
Guerreros de Oaxaca players
Hanwha Eagles players
KBO League first basemen
Las Vegas 51s players

Leones del Escogido players
Living people
Los Angeles Dodgers players
Major League Baseball catchers
Major League Baseball players from the Dominican Republic
Mexican League baseball first basemen
Olmecas de Tabasco players
San Antonio Missions players
San Bernardino Stampede players
Savannah Sand Gnats players
Sultanes de Monterrey players